The New Beginning is an annual professional wrestling event promoted by New Japan Pro-Wrestling (NJPW). The event has been held since 2011 as a pay-per-view (PPV). From 2013 to 2014, the event also aired outside Japan as an internet pay-per-view (iPPV). Since 2015, the event has aired worldwide on NJPW's internet streaming site, NJPW World. The event is held in February, the month following NJPW's biggest annual event, the January 4 Dome Show, usually the culmination point of major storylines. As the name of the event suggests, it marks the beginning of a new year for the promotion. Since 2012, the event is mainly held at Osaka Prefectural Gymnasium (also known as Bodymaker Colosseum and Edion Arena Osaka) in Osaka.

Events

See also

 List of New Japan Pro-Wrestling pay-per-view events

References

External links
 The official New Japan Pro-Wrestling website
 The New Beginning at ProWrestlingHistory.com